Chris Harrington may refer to:

 Chris Harrington (American football) (born 1985), American football player
 Chris Harrington (ice hockey) (born 1982), ice hockey player
 Chris Harrington (footballer) (1891–1978), English footballer
 Chris Harrington (Home and Away), a fictional character in the Australian soap opera Home and Away